iSkeleton Framework is a design methodology that provides a formal strategy for optimizing web images, especially those used in CSS sprites. The iSkeleton (image skeleton) framework is a front-end design methodology that aims to segregate unchanging (for the most part of a web application's life) static images of a web application, and base64 encode them into a JavaScript file, which will serve them inline. The techniques prescribed are existing and known to developers who may use a subset - or all of it - to enhance delivery of static contents. This framework is designed to help conserve time and resource utilization by eliminating the redundant usage of network and server bandwidth (an aspect of app-developer awareness that needs to be raised). 

The framework can go hand in hand with any existing architecture and gives developers the option to selectively decide which components to include as a part of the framework. It can be implemented upon an existing live web app. A before-and-after snapshot of the network, web server usage, and front-end response time measures can give statistical data on improvement achieved; it can keep extending the framework to the entire web application, based on developer discretion. If a web application is being written from scratch, the developers of iSkeleton recommended use of the framework from the outset, as, in their view, this will enhance design strength and user experience.

References

Web design

ca:Disseny web adaptatiu
cs:Responzivní web design
de:Responsive Design
es:Diseño web adaptativo
fr:Responsive Web Design
ru:Адаптивный веб-дизайн